Mustafa Demir (b 18 January 1961) is a Turkish politician, a member of parliament, the former Minister of Public Works and Housing under Prime Minister Recep Tayyip Erdoğan, and the founder and former chairman of the ruling AK Party's Samsun Province chapter.

Biography

Early life and education 

He was born in the Black Sea Region town of Şalpazarı in Trabzon into a family with 9 children. His father Hüseyin Demir was a famous coppersmith nicknamed 'Bakırcı Hüseyin' in the Şalpazarı District. Following his primary and high school education in Trabzon, Mustafa Demir matriculated in 1979 at Karadeniz Technical University and graduated in 1983 with a degree in architecture.

Career 

He started commerce in his high school years. He was busy with copper-aluminium plate & kitchen goods fabrication and wholesaling in these years. He had his military training as a reserve officer - control engineer. He worked in private sector as a decompte definitif expert and in public sector as a control engineer. He has been working as a building contractor, architect, and durable consumer goods tradesman since 1991. On 29 September 2001, he founded the AK Party Samsun chapter. He was elected as an MP from the party in the 3rd order in Samsun in the 2002 Turkish general election.

He was reelected as MP for the second time in the 1st order, once again from Samsun Province, in the 2007 Turkish general election, and was appointed as Minister of Public Works and Housing in 2009, holding the post until 2011.

He re-entered the Grand National Assembly of Turkey as the 24th Term Samsun Deputy. He was elected as Samsun Metropolitan Municipality Mayor in 2019 Turkish local elections.

Mayor of Samsun 

As Mayor of Samsun, Mustafa Demir has advocated for several major development projects including the renovation of Samsun Saathane Square, the Samsun waterfront and the construction of the Samsun National Garden. His administration has also overseen the construction of multiple underground and road infrastructure projects.

Marital status 

He is married and has 5 children.

References 

1961 births
Living people
Government ministers of Turkey
Deputies of Samsun
Justice and Development Party (Turkey) politicians
Ministers of Public Works of Turkey
Members of the 24th Parliament of Turkey
Members of the 60th government of Turkey